The 1976 Campeonato Argentino de Rugby  was won by the selection of Buenos Aires that beat in the final the selection of Unión de Rugby de Cuyo.

Rugby union in Argentina in 1976

National
 The Buenos Aires Champsionship was won by C.A.S.I.
 The Cordoba Province Championship was won by Universitario
 The North-East Championship was won by Los Tarcos and Natación y Gimnasia

International
 All Blacks visit for the first time Argentina. They won both test against Argentina

 In 1976, Argentina, visited Wales in the same period of the finals of championship. Is a greta tour with a sefetat at last minute with Wales

Preliminaries

Zone 1

Zone 2

Zone 3

Zone 4

Interzone

Semifinals 
 Score system:  Try= 4 points, Conversion=2 points .Penalty and kick from mark=  3 points. Drop= 3 points. 

 Buenos Aires:S. Gutiérrez, O'Farrell, Benyon, Sansot, Balfour, U. O'Farrell, Capalbo, Devoto, Lucke, De Vedia, M. García Haymes, Casaba, J. Rodríguez jurado, Suárez, Correa, Ventura.
Rosario:' B. Blanco, Giner, C. Blanco, Escalante, Romero Acuña, Scilabra, Baetti, Pavani, Senatore, Pecce, Mangiamelli, Svetez, Imhoff, Macat, Todeschini.

 Chubut: Ojeda, Vidal, Van Gelderen, Amorós, Maldonádo, Rivas, Clarke, Vernetti, R. Domínguez, Iliana, Paits, Sansinena, Aguirre, Fernández, Couderc (Schmidt).
Cuyo:' Stahringher, Massera, Morgan, Tarquini, Terarnova, Guarrochena, Gancia, Crivelli, Campoy, Antonini, Viaso, Ituarte, Carro, Cichitti, Scaiola.

Final

 Buenos Aires: S. Gutiérrez O'Farrell, Benyon, Balfour (U. O'Farrell), I. Gutiérrez O'Farrell, Sansot, Igarzábal, Landajo (cap), García Haymes, Lucke, Casaba, Green, J. Rodríguez jurado, Ventura, Vila, Cerioni.
 Cuyo:' Muñiz, Massera, Morgan, Tarquini, Terranova, Guarrochena, Chacón, Nasazzi, Naves¡, Antonini, Serpa, Ituarte, Cruz, Crivelli, Micheli.

Bibliography 
  Memorias de la UAR 1976
  XXXII Campeonato Argentino
  Francesco Volpe, Paolo Pacitti (Author), Rugby 2000, GTE Gruppo Editorale (1999).

Campeonato Argentino de Rugby
Argentina
Rugby